Eikerapen or Eikjerapen is a village in Åseral municipality in Agder county, Norway.

Eikerapen has a popular ski resort that is open in the winter time, with ski lifts and many ski slopes. There are many holiday cottages in the village near the ski centre. Eikerapen Roots Festival is an annual international roots music festival, held at Eikerapen in August each year.

References

Villages in Agder
Åseral